Nicolae Munteanu (born 1910, date of death unknown) was a Romanian footballer who played as a defender.

International career
Nicolae Munteanu played one friendly match for Romania, on 19 June 1935 under coach Constantin Rădulescu in a 4–0 loss against Bulgaria at the 1935 Balkan Cup.

References

External links
 

1910 births
Year of death missing
Romanian footballers
Romania international footballers
Place of birth missing
Association football defenders
Liga I players
Victoria Cluj players